Manuel Ortiz Guerrero (16 July 1894 – 8 May 1933) was a Paraguayan poet and musician.

Biography
Guerrero was born in Ybaroty, a neighbourhood in the city of Villarrica del Espíritu Santo, Paraguay.  He was the son of Vicente Ortiz and Susana Guerrero, who died after giving birth. He was raised by his grandmother, Florencia Ortiz. He completed his first studies in a school in Villarrica, and stood out for his interest in scholarly works.Is mestizo 69% native america and 31 Spanish european

He was shy and not very social. In Colegio Nacional de Villarrica he evolved as a poet and developed his first verses. His classmates then started calling him Manú, nickname by which he would be immortalized.

He arrived in Asunción in 1914, where he studied in the Colegio Nacional de la Capital and gained a status of poet and leader of a whole generation. 

He published his first poems in the Revista del Centro Estudiantil student centre magazine. Soon, local papers showed interest in him and allowed him popularity and an audience. One of his best pieces, "Loca", was published in the magazine Letras. He lived with his friend and also poet Guillermo Molinas Rolón.

In the 1920s he published poems such as "Surgente", "Pepitas" y "Nubes del este" and plays like "Eireté", "La Conquista" and "El crimen de Tintalila".  He also wrote the lyrics in guarani for the some of the songs of his friend  José Asunción Flores. Pieces like "India" and "Buenos Aires" were written in Spanish.

Guerrero was exiled from his country and went to Brazil. He died in Buenos Aires, Argentina, in 1933, victim of Hansen disease. His ashes rest in the city where he was born, and in a plaza of Asunción called "Manuel Ortiz Guerrero y José Asunción Flores". Posthumous publications of his works include Obras completas (1952) and Arenillas de mi tierra (1969).

Work 
Characterized by modernism, “Loca” is followed by other poems that have a rather romantic tang: “Raída poty”, “Guarán-i”, “La sortija”, “Diana de gloria”.

He wrote indistinctively in Spanish and in Guaraní, succeeding admirably with poems  in the second language, most of all, beautiful poems that serve as lyrics for the most important guaranias of  José Asunción Flores: “Panambí verá”, “Nde rendape aju”, “Kerasy”y“Paraguaype”.  In his book La poesía paraguaya – Historia de una incógnita, the Brazilian critic Walter Wey writes: “Ortiz Guerrero represented the great courage of being an intellectual in a country without editors, even that of living exclusively from art, since writing poems and playing the guitar were the only things he was good at.

He would print his poems in his own typing machine and sell them from door to door. He managed to get to the people in a way such that they were touched by the  leproso, Towards the end of his existence,  Manú received his last visitors and friends in the darkest corner of his miserable room, placing the chairs strategically distant from the bed so that they didn’t see him. The scars of this struggle with life and for life are reborn in some of his verses and in brochures tituled “Cantimplora”, which testify the painful path of the guarani poet.”

References 
Centro Cultural de la República El Cabildo
 Diccionario Biográfico "FORJADORES DEL PARAGUAY", Primera Edicción Enero de 2000. Distribuidora Quevedo de Ediciones. Buenos Aires, Argentina.

External links 
 Música Paraguaya
 Staff.Uni-mainz

1894 births
1933 deaths
People from Villarrica, Paraguay
Paraguayan musicians
20th-century Paraguayan poets
Paraguayan male poets
Guarani-language writers
Indigenous people of the Gran Chaco
Guaraní people
20th-century indigenous people of the Americas
Paraguayan people of Guarani descent
20th-century male writers